Asteromyia gutierreziae is a species of gall midges in the family Cecidomyiidae.

They are black, about 3-5mm long and found on upper leaves, lower leaves and the stem.

They can cause Galls, on such plants as Medranoa palmeri (Texas Desert Goldenrod), Baccharis angustifolia, Baccharis sarothroides, Gutierrezia californica, Gutierrezia microcephala, Gutierrezia sarothrae and Gymnosperma glutinosum.

References

Further reading
 Raymond J. Gagné: (1968) A Taxonomic Revision of the Genus Asteromyia (Diptera: Cecidomyiidae)

 
 

Cecidomyiinae
Articles created by Qbugbot
Insects described in 1916